Following is a list of justices of the Massachusetts Supreme Judicial Court.

Current justices

Superior Court of Judicature (1692–1775)

Justices appointed by the Provincial Congress (1775–80) 

Three men declined appointment to the Court during this period: William Reed in 1775, Robert Treat Paine in 1776, and James Warren in 1777.

Justices under the State Constitution (1780–present)

List of justices

Notes

Sources

Judges of the Supreme Court
Massachusetts